Mongrels, formerly known under the working titles of We Are Mongrels and The Un-Natural World, is a British puppet-based situation comedy series first broadcast on BBC Three between 22 June and 10 August 2010, with a making-of documentary entitled "Mongrels Uncovered" broadcast on 11 August 2010. The series revolves around the lives of five anthropomorphic animals who hang around the back of a pub in the Isle of Dogs, London. The characters are Nelson, a metrosexual fox (voiced by Rufus Jones, performed by Andy Heath); Destiny, an Afghan hound (voiced by Lucy Montgomery, performed by Richard Coombs); Marion, a "borderline-retarded" cat (voiced by Dan Tetsell, performed by Warrick Brownlow-Pike); Kali, a grudge-bearing pigeon (voiced by Katy Brand, performed by Iestyn Evans); and Vince, a sociopathic foul-mouthed fox (voiced by Paul Kaye, performed by various puppeteers).

Mongrels originally began as an unbroadcast pilot when it was known as We Are Mongrels. Differences between the pilot and the series included a different voice actor and puppet to portray Marion (Ray Panthaki), Destiny and Kali are also portrayed by different puppets, Vince doesn't swear constantly and the appearance of a sixth character, Debbie the suicidal chicken, who was eventually dropped from the show. Following from this pilot a full series was commissioned.

The first series consisted of eight episodes and the making-of special. A second series was also commissioned. On 18 January 2012 it was announced via Twitter that Mongrels had not been renewed for a third series by the BBC. The series was created and directed by Adam Miller. The producer for the series is Stephen McCrum.

Series overview

Episode list

Series 1 (2010)

Series 2 (2011)

Footnotes

References
General
 
 
 

Specific

Lists of British sitcom episodes